Manly railway station is located on the Cleveland line in Queensland, Australia. It serves the Brisbane suburb of Manly.

History
Manly station opened in 1888 as the original terminus of the line. The line was later extended to the original Cleveland station in 1889.

In 1992, the original timber station was demolished after becoming infested with termites. To the west of the station lies a City network stabling yard.

Services
Manly is served by Cleveland line services from Shorncliffe, Northgate, Doomben and Bowen Hills to Cleveland. During morning peak hour 7 trains begin their service at Manly while 6 services from Cleveland during the same time run express Manly-Morningside. This pattern is repeated in the afternoon however only 4 trains will terminate at Manly.

Services by platform

During peak hour some services depart from different platforms.

References

External links

Manly station Queensland's Railways on the Internet
[ Manly station] TransLink travel information

Railway stations in Brisbane
Railway stations in Australia opened in 1888